The Benson Archeological Site, designated 13WD50 in the state archaeological inventory, is a historic site located near Smithland, Iowa, United States. Pottery fragments found at the site include Black Sand and Crawford ware from the early Woodland period and Valley ware from the Middle Woodland period. The site was listed on the National Register of Historic Places in 1984.

References

Woodland period
Native American history of Iowa
Protected areas of Woodbury County, Iowa
National Register of Historic Places in Woodbury County, Iowa
Archaeological sites on the National Register of Historic Places in Iowa